Rachel Brooks (born 30 September 1963, from Wroot) is an English darts player.

Career
Brooks started playing darts when she was 45, and now competes on the international level. In 2012, she won her first tournament, the Czech Open, and in 2013 she won the World Masters. She had many other good results that year, and qualified for the Women's World Championship in 2014 as the number five seed. Brooks lost her first-round game against Ann-Louise Peters. Brooks has now joined the PDC organisation and will be competing against men

World Championship Results

BDO
 2014: 1st Round (lost to Ann-Louise Peters 0-2)
 2015: Quarter-finals (lost to Sharon Prins 1-2)
 2016: 1st Round (lost to Lorraine Winstanley 0-2)
 2017: 1st Round (lost to Aileen de Graaf 0-2)

References

External links
Rachel Brooks profile at Darts Database

1963 births
English darts players
Living people
British Darts Organisation players
Professional Darts Corporation women's players
Professional Darts Corporation associate players